Noémi Trufán (born 11 January 1985 in Târgu Mureș) is a Romanian-born Hungarian handballer who most recently played for Ferencvárosi TC on professional level. After that she left FTC, first she played in Germany, then in Luxemburg.

Achievements

Nemzeti Bajnokság I:
Bronze Medallist: 2011
Magyar Kupa:
Silver Medallist: 2010
EHF Cup Winners' Cup:
Winner: 2011

References

External links

 Noémi Trufán player profile on Ferencvárosi TC Official Website
 Noémi Trufán career statistics on Worldhandball.com

1985 births
Living people
Sportspeople from Târgu Mureș
Hungarian female handball players